William Nathaniel Bell (March 6, 1817 – September 6, 1887), originally from Edwardsville, Illinois and later a resident of Portland, Oregon, was a member of the Denny Party, the first group of white settlers in what is now Seattle, Washington. He lived in Seattle from 1851 to 1856 and then again from 1870 till his death.

in 1852, Bell was a delegate at the Monticello Convention that produced a petition to US Congress to split the Oregon Territory, creating the Washington Territory, which would later become the state of Washington.

Family

His first wife, Sarah Ann Peter (daughter of Keziah Peter), died of tuberculosis in June 1856. With her, he had five children:

 Laura Keziah 1842–1887 (married surname: Coffman) 
 Olive Julia 1846–1921  (married surnames: Stearns and Stewart)
 Mary Virginia 1847–1931 (married 1872 to George W. Hall) 
 Alvina Lavina 1851–1857 
 Austin Americus 1854–1889

His second wife, Lucy Gamble, was the younger sister of Sarah Ann.

Legacy
His family is remembered in the name Belltown, a neighborhood immediately north of Downtown where his land claim was located. Bell named many of the streets in the area after his own children, including Bell Street, Virginia and Olive Streets and Olive Way (named for his daughters), and Stewart Street, named for Olive's husband Joseph H. Stewart.

Notes

1817 births
1887 deaths
History of Seattle
People from Seattle
People from Portland, Oregon
Washington (state) pioneers